Eric Hughes (born April 30, 1965) is an American basketball coach who serves as an assistant coach for the Philadelphia 76ers of the National Basketball Association (NBA).

College coaching career 
Hughes got his first gig with the Illinois State Redbirds as an assistant coach from 1989 until he was hired as an assistant coach for the California Golden Bears in 1991 to 1993. Washington Huskies then hired him as an assistant for nine years after that.

NBA coaching career

Toronto Raptors 
Raptors gave Hughes his first gig in the NBA in the front office as a Basketball Development Consultant in 2007 until the Raptors decided to put him on their coaching bench in 2009.

Brooklyn Nets 
Hughes joined Jason Kidd's bench as an assistant in June 2013.

Milwaukee Bucks 
Hughes rejoined Kidd in Milwaukee until 2018.

Philadelphia 76ers 
In 2019, after the Bucks fired him, Brett Brown hired him as a Player Development Coach. After Doc Rivers was hired, he was promoted to assistant coach.

Personal life 
Eric is married to Kristin Hughes and has two sons. Hughes is also a native of Oakland, California.

References 

1965 births
Living people
American expatriate basketball people in Canada
American men's basketball coaches
American men's basketball players
Basketball coaches from California
Basketball players from Oakland, California
Brooklyn Nets assistant coaches
California Golden Bears men's basketball coaches
Cal State East Bay Pioneers men's basketball players
High school basketball coaches in California
Illinois State Redbirds men's basketball coaches
Illinois State University alumni
Junior college men's basketball players in the United States
Milwaukee Bucks assistant coaches
Ohlone College alumni
Philadelphia 76ers assistant coaches
Toronto Raptors assistant coaches
Washington Huskies men's basketball coaches